Princess Sirindhorn of Thailand, the Princess Royal and the Princess Debaratana Rajasuda   (born April 2, 1955), formerly Princess Sirindhorn Debaratanasuda Kitivadhanadulsobhak, is the second daughter of King Bhumibol Adulyadej and younger sister of King Vajiralongkorn. Thais commonly refer to her as "Phra Thep", meaning "princess angel". Her title in Thai is the female equivalent of the title once held by her brother, King Maha Vajiralongkorn. The Thai constitution was altered in 1974 to allow for female succession, thus making her eligible for the throne. Having been the eldest female child of the royal family (excluding Princess Ubolratana Rajakanya, who married a foreign commoner), her position is comparable to a princess royal.

Early life

Birth 
Sirindhorn was born on April 2, 1955, at Amphorn Sathan Residential Hall, Dusit Palace. The third child of King Bhumibol and Queen Sirikit. As the royal couple has only one son, the Thai constitution was altered in 1974 to allow for female succession. This made Sirindhorn second-in-line to the throne (after Vajiralongkorn) until the birth of Princess Bajrakitiyabha in 1978.

Early education 

Sirindhorn attended Kindergarten, Primary and Secondary at Thailand's most exclusive school: The Chitralada School which was established for the children of the Royal Family and Palace staff.

She ranked first in the National School Examinations in primary level (grade 7) in 1967, in upper secondary level (grade 12) in 1972, and fourth in the National University Entrance Examination in 1975.

Higher education 
In 1975 she enrolled in the faculty of arts at Chulalongkorn University and graduated with a Bachelor of Arts, first-class honours and a gold medal in history in 1976.

From 1976 she continued her studies in two graduate programs concurrently, obtaining a Master of Arts in Oriental epigraphy (Sanskrit and Cambodian) in 1980 and also archaeology from Silpakorn University in 1980. From October 1977, she studied Sanskrit in Bangkok for two years under the tutelage of renowned Sanskrit scholar Satya Vrat Shastri. In 1978, she obtained a Master of Arts in Pali and Sanskrit from Chulalongkorn University.

In 1981 she enrolled in a doctoral program at Srinakharinwirot University, and was awarded a PhD in developmental education in 1987.

In 1984 she earned a certificate from the Asian Regional Remote Sensing Training Centre at the Asian Institute of Technology where she studied for two months.

In April 2001 she won a scholarship in Chinese culture at Peking University in China where she studied the course for a month.

Later life
In December 2012, Sirindhorn was briefly hospitalised to remove calcium deposits.

More popular among the Thai public than her brother Crown Prince Vajiralongkorn, Sirindhorn was long rumored to be a potential successor to the Thai throne. In the event, on Bhumibol's death in 2016, the crown went to Vajiralongkorn, now King Rama X.

In January 2021, Sirindhorn was hospitalized after breaking both her ankles. Thai media reported that she fell during a walk; however, Western sources alleged that her ankles were broken by Vajiralongkorn after an argument.

Works and interests 

Aside from her passion for technology, she holds degrees in history and a doctorate in educational development. She teaches at the history department of the Chulachomklao Royal Military Academy, where she is the nominal head of the department. In addition to Thai, she speaks fluent English, French and Mandarin Chinese, and is currently studying German and Latin. She translates Chinese literature into Thai.

She is also a skilled performer and avid promoter of Thai traditional music.

Like her father Bhumibol Adulyadej, Princess Sirindhorn holds a certificate as a radio amateur, with her call sign being HS1D.

Scholarship 
The University of Liverpool introduced a prestigious new scholarship in honour of Sirindhorn. One full scholarship will be awarded annually to enable a Thai student to study at Liverpool to complete a one-year taught Masters programme. The scholarship is open to all subjects in which a one-year taught Masters programme is offered; however, priority will be given to those students who wish to study in a subject area associated with Princess Sirindhorn such as science, information technology, medicine, the arts, geography, history, and languages. To be eligible for the scholarship, applicants must be a Thai national and already hold an offer to study a one-year taught Masters programme at the University of Liverpool.

Honours and awards

Military rank
 General, Admiral and Air Chief Marshal

Volunteer Defense Corps of Thailand rank
 Volunteer Defense Corps General

Academic rank
 Professor of Chulachomklao Royal Military Academy
 Professor of Srinakharinwirot University

Foreign honours
 : Grand Cross of the Order of Honour for Services to the Republic of Austria
 : Recipient of the Order of Friendship
 : Padma Bhushan
 : Grand Cross of the Order of Diplomatic Service Merit
 : Honorary Grand Commander of the Order of Loyalty to the Crown of Malaysia
 : Grand Cross of the Order of the Polar Star
 : Grand Cross of the Order of the Crescent of Pakistan
 : Knight Grand Cross of the Order of Isabella the Catholic
 : Member Grand Cross of the Royal Order of the Seraphim

Awards 
 : International Union of Nutritional Sciences Award
 : Chinese Language and Culture Friendship Award
  Chinese Literature Foundation of Chinese Writers Association: Understanding and Friendship International Literature Award
 : Indira Gandhi Prize
 : Ramon Magsaysay Award for Public Service

Honorary degrees 
 National
  Chiang Mai University: Geography
  Chiang Mai University: Thai language
  Asian Institute of Technology: Technology

 Foreign
 :
  – The University of Hong Kong: Doctor of Letters
 Peking University: Chinese language
  – Tokai University: Engineering
  – University of the Philippines Los Baños: Law
 :
  – Pomona College: Doctor of Humane Letters
  – Indiana University Bloomington: Doctor of Humane Letters
  – Northern Illinois University: Doctor of Humane Letters
  – Johns Hopkins University: Doctor of Humane Letters
  – Bay Path University: Doctor of Humane Letters

Honorary titles 
 : People’s Friendship Ambassador
 : Special Ambassador of the World Food Programme for School Feeding
 : UNESCO Goodwill Ambassador for "Empowerment of Minority Children through Education and through the Preservation of Their Intangible Cultural Heritage"

Eponyms

Institutions

National 
A number of academic and research institutions in Thailand are named after her:
 Princess Sirindhorn's College, Mueang Nakhon Pathom, Nakhon Pathom Province.
 Princess Maha Chakri Sirindhorn Anthropology Centre
 Mahachakri Sirindhorn and Boromrajkumari Building, Faculty of Arts, Chulalongkorn University, Bangkok.
 Somdech Phra Debaratana Medical Center, Ramathibodi Hospital, Bangkok.
 Princess Maha Chakri Sirindhorn Music Library, Mahidol University, Bangkok
 Sirindhorn International Institute of Technology (SIIT), Thammasat University, Bangkok.
 Sirindhorn International Thai-German Graduate School of Engineering (TGGS), King Mongkut's Institute of Technology North Bangkok.
 Princess Maha Chakri Sirindhorn Natural History Museum, natural history museum, Faculty of Science, Prince of Songkla University, Hat Yai Campus, Hat Yai, Songkhla Province.
 Sirindhorn Observatory, Chiang Mai University, Doi Suthep, Chiang Mai Province.
 Princess Sirindhorn Neutron Monitor, a Galactic cosmic ray detector at Thailand's highest mountain, Doi Inthanon, Chiang Mai Province.
 Princess Maha Chakri Sirindhorn Medical Center, Srinakharinwirot University, Onkarak Campus, Nakhon Nayok Province

Foreign 
 Sirindhorn Technology and Culture Exchange Center, Peking University, Haidian District, Beijing, China.
 Mianyang Xianfenglu Sirindhorn Primary School, Mianyang, Sichuan, China.

Places 
 Sirindhorn MRT station of the Bangkok MRT Blue Line
 Amphoe Sirindhorn of Ubon Ratchathani Province
 Sirindhorn Dam stops the Dom Noi River in Sirindhorn, Ubon Ratchathani Province.
 Sirindhorn Museum  (Phu Kum Khao Dinosaur Museum), Phu Kum Khao Dinosaur Research Center, Sahatsakhan, Kalasin Province.
 Sirindhorn Observatory, Department of Physics, Faculty of Science, Chiang Mai University
 Princess Sirindhorn Stadium, is a sports stadium in Si Racha, Chonburi Province.

Fauna 
Several fauna species are named after her, including:
 Eurochelidon sirintarae (Princess Sirindhorn bird or white-eyed river martin), a critically endangered swallow first described in 1968.
 Phricotelphusa sirindhorn (panda crab). It was described in Crustaceana in 1989.
 Phuwiangosaurus sirindhornae, a sauropod herbivore dinosaur from the Early Cretaceous period. It was described in 1994.
 Sirindhorna khoratensis, a hadrosauroid dinosaur from the Early Cretaceous. It was described in 2015.
 Acanthosquilla sirindhorn (panda mantis shrimp). It was described in Crustaceana in 1995.
 Tarsius sirindhornae, an ancient primate.
 Streptocephalus sirindhornae, a freshwater fairy shrimp. It was described in the Journal of Crustacean Biology in 2000.
 Macrobrachium sirindhorn, a freshwater prawn. It was described in Crustaceana in 2001.
 Trigona sirindhornae, a bee.
 Sirindhorn thailandiensis (princess moth).
 Loxosomatoides sirindhornae, a freshwater kamptozoan. It was described in Hydrobiologia in 2005.

Flora 
Numerous plant species have been named after her:
 Sirindhornia spp., orchids:
 Sirindhornia pulchella can only be seen in Doi Chiang Dao National Park, blooming from April to June.
 Sirindhornia mirabilis can only be seen in Doi Hua Mot in Tak Province, blooming during May and June.
 Sirindhornia monophyla can be seen in Doi Hua Mot in Tak Province from March to June, as well in Myanmar and China.
 Other plant species include:
 Bauhinia sirindhorniae (sam sip song pra dong), a vine of the pea family. It was described in the Nordic Journal of Botany in 1997.
 Magnolia sirindhorniae (Princess Sirindhorn's magnolia)
 Thepparatia scandens Phuph. or Khruea thepparat malvaceae. Thepparat is a part of her royal title. It was described in the Thai Forest Bulletin (Botany) in 2006.
 Impatiens sirindhorniae Triboun & Suksathan, 2009. It was described in Gardens' Bulletin Singapore.

Ancestry

Notes

References

External links 

 Her Royal Highness Princess Maha Chakri Sirindhorn’s Personal Affairs Division
 "Biography of Her Royal Highness Princess Maha Chakri Sirindhorn", at Kanchanapisek Network
 Maha Chakri Sirindhorn and Thai Heritage Conservation
 The Forest Herbarium
 Scholarship Website Information 

Mahidol family
Thai female Chao Fa
Princesses Royal
Academic staff of Chulachomklao Royal Military Academy
S
Thai diplomats
Thai environmentalists
Thai women environmentalists
20th-century Thai historians
Thai generals
Thai admirals
Royal Thai Air Force air marshals
Thai philanthropists
Thai women academics
Women historians
Thai Sanskrit scholars
Thai translators
Translators to Thai
Translators from Chinese
Translators from French
Translators from German
Translators from Sanskrit
People from Bangkok
Thai people of Mon descent
Children of Bhumibol Adulyadej
Daughters of kings

Chulalongkorn University alumni
Silpakorn University alumni
Srinakharinwirot University alumni
Peking University alumni
Chulachomklao Royal Military Academy alumni

Recipients of the Padma Bhushan in literature & education
Ramon Magsaysay Award winners
UNESCO Goodwill Ambassadors
Knights Grand Cordon of the Order of Chula Chom Klao
Knights Grand Cross of the Order of the Direkgunabhorn
Recipients of the Dushdi Mala Medal, Pin of Arts and Science
Commandeurs of the Ordre des Palmes Académiques
Grand Cordons of the Order of the Precious Crown
Grand Crosses Special Class of the Order of Merit of the Federal Republic of Germany
Grand Crosses of the Order of the Crown (Netherlands)
Grand Crosses of the Order of the Dannebrog
Honorary Grand Commanders of the Order of Loyalty to the Crown of Malaysia
Recipients of Hilal-i-Imtiaz
Recipients of the Decoration for Services to the Republic of Austria
Recipients of the Grand Decoration with Sash for Services to the Republic of Austria
Recipients of the Order of Isabella the Catholic
Knights Grand Cross of the Order of Isabella the Catholic
Honorary Dames Grand Cross of the Royal Victorian Order

21st-century translators
20th-century translators
20th-century Thai women writers
21st-century Thai women writers
1955 births
Living people
Recipients of Hilal-i-Pakistan
Thai women educators
Thai women diplomats
21st-century Thai historians
20th-century Chakri dynasty
21st-century Chakri dynasty